Tom Howard (born 20 September 1948) is a Canadian long-distance runner. He competed in the marathon at the 1976 Summer Olympics.

References

1948 births
Living people
Athletes (track and field) at the 1976 Summer Olympics
Canadian male long-distance runners
Canadian male marathon runners
Olympic track and field athletes of Canada
Athletes (track and field) at the 1975 Pan American Games
Athletes (track and field) at the 1979 Pan American Games
Pan American Games bronze medalists for Canada
Pan American Games medalists in athletics (track and field)
Athletes from Vancouver
Medalists at the 1975 Pan American Games
20th-century Canadian people